Meadow Brook Hall is a Tudor revival style mansion located at 350 Estate Drive in Rochester Hills, Michigan. It was built between 1926 and 1929 by the heiress to the Dodge automaker fortune, Matilda Dodge Wilson and her second husband, lumber baron, Alfred Wilson. Covering  with 110 rooms, the structure is the fourth largest historic mansion museum in the United States, and is classified as one of America's Castles. In 1957, the mansion and the surrounding property and buildings were donated to the state of Michigan in order to fund Michigan State University–Oakland, now known as Oakland University. The structure was named a National Historic Landmark in 2012.

History
Meadow Brook Farms originally belonged to Matilda's first husband, automotive tycoon John F. Dodge. He purchased the property along with the large white farmhouse off Adams Road as a holiday retreat for his family. The mansion is located on a  estate off South Adams Road; Dodge added a nine-hole golf course, some of the holes of which still follow the current Katke-Cousins 18-hole course on the property. Meadow Brook Hall was constructed between 1926 and 1929 by Matilda Dodge Wilson and her second husband, Alfred Wilson at a cost of $4 million.  Throughout her lifetime, Matilda resided in the hall for nearly forty years. Some of the family's time was spent vacationing at their summer home in Bar Harbor, Maine and winter home in Scottsdale, Arizona. The hall was also partially closed for a brief time during the depth of the Depression.

Covering  and with 110 rooms, the mansion is the fourth largest historic house museum in the United States. It was designed by William Kapp of the firm Smith, Hinchman & Grylls in a Tudor-revival style.  The building features stonework and a plaster dining room ceiling created by Corrado Parducci.  Much of the original artwork collected by the Wilsons is still found at Meadow Brook including paintings by Anthony van Dyck, Rosa Bonheur, Joshua Reynolds, John Constable and Thomas Gainsborough, as well as Tiffany glass, Stickley furniture, Meissen porcelain, and Rookwood pottery. The estate was added to the National Register of Historic Places in 1979 and National Historic Landmark in 2012.

In 1957, Alfred and Matilda Dodge Wilson donated the 1,500 acre estate to Michigan State University, along with $2 million to create a branch college campus, now known as Oakland University. The Wilsons lived in Meadow Brook Hall until Alfred's death in 1962. Mrs. Wilson continued to live on the property until her death in 1967.

Additional buildings which were also designed by William Kapp on the estate included:
Knole Cottage (1926), a six-room miniature playhouse on the Meadow Brook estate.
Sunset Terrace, a retirement home for Matilda and Alfred Wilson on Meadow Brook, which in 1963 became the Oakland University president's home.

Concours d'Elegance
The Meadow Brook Concours d'Elegance was held annually during August on the grounds of Meadow Brook Hall from 1979 until 2010. This week-long event was one of the largest collector car shows in the world, and a social event in the tradition of the first Concours in 1920s Paris which was an exhibition of automotive design, craftsmanship, history and a tool for automobile manufacturers to market products. Over the years, the event also served as a fundraiser for the preservation of Meadow Brook Hall.

On July 20, 2010, promoters announced that the Concours d'Elegance would leave Meadow Brook Hall after that year for the Inn at St. John's in Plymouth, Michigan. The event is now known at the Concours d'Elegance of America at St. John's.

See also
 List of castles in the United States
 List of largest houses in the United States
 List of National Historic Landmarks in Michigan
 National Register of Historic Places listings in Oakland County, Michigan

References
Inline

General
A&E with Richard Guy Wilson, Ph.D.,(2000). America's Castles: The Auto Baron Estates, A&E Television Network.
Kvaran, Einar Einarsson, Shadowing Parducci, unpublished manuscript.
Wilson, Matilda Rausch Dodge, Debbie Patrick, ed., (1998). A Place in the Country: Matilda Wilson's Personal Guidebook to Meadow Brook Hall, Rochester, MI: Oakland University Press.

External links

 

National Register of Historic Places in Oakland County, Michigan
National Historic Landmarks in Metro Detroit
Houses completed in 1929
Historic house museums in Michigan
Concours d'Elegance
Oakland University campus
Museums in Oakland County, Michigan
Art museums and galleries in Michigan
University museums in Michigan
Tourist attractions in Metro Detroit
Houses in Oakland County, Michigan
Gilded Age mansions
Tudor Revival architecture in Michigan